Boaz Merenstein (born 3 April 1970) is an Israeli former professional tennis player.

Biography
Merenstein was born into a Tel Aviv family with German origins.

He won a gold medal in men's doubles at the 1989 Maccabiah Games, playing alongside Shahar Perkiss.

A left-handed player, Merenstein was a Davis Cup squad member for Israel and featured in the singles main draw of every Tel Aviv Open from 1987 to 1990, making the second round twice. One of his first round wins came in 1989 against Matt Anger, a former world number 23. In both of his second round matches he was eliminated by Amos Mansdorf.

In 1992 he played collegiate tennis for Pepperdine University.

References

External links
 
 

1970 births
Living people
Israeli male tennis players
Pepperdine Waves men's tennis players
Sportspeople from Tel Aviv
Israeli people of German-Jewish descent
Maccabiah Games medalists in tennis
Maccabiah Games silver medalists for Israel
Competitors at the 1989 Maccabiah Games